Michael Erdlen (born 7 July 1970) is a Swiss rower. He competed at the 1996 Summer Olympics and the 2000 Summer Olympics.

References

External links
 

1970 births
Living people
Swiss male rowers
Olympic rowers of Switzerland
Rowers at the 1996 Summer Olympics
Rowers at the 2000 Summer Olympics
Rowers from Zürich